Shaheen is a 1980 Pakistani historical and Islamic drama television series originally broadcast on PTV. The series was based on the novel of the same name by Naseem Hijazi and dramatised by Saleem Ahmad. Set in the 1490s in Granada, the series entails the glorious past of the Muslims and revolves around their downfall in Undalus (present day Spain).

Premise 

The series is set in the 15th century in Granada. The story entails the glorious past of the Muslims in that region, the reasons for their downfall, and also talks about the struggles that they made for the integrity of their ending empire.

Cast 

 Ismael Shah as Badar Bin Mugheera
 Tahira Wasti as Isabella I of Castile
 Rashid Mehmood as King Ferdinand II of Aragon
 Shakeel as King Abu Abdullah
 Badar Khalil as Meerya
 Sultana Zafar as Khatoon Begum
 Huma Akbar as Angela
 Misbah Khalid as Abu Abdullah's mother
 Mazhar Ali as Bashir Bin Hassan
 Saleem Nasir
 Anwar Iqbal

Reception 

The historical events in the series were called as clear misrepresentation by the NCJP.

References

External links 
 

1980 television series debuts
Urdu-language television shows